

Eadbald (or Eadbeald; died between 796 and 798) was a medieval Bishop of London.

Eadbald was consecrated between 793 and 796. He died between 796 and 798.

Citations

References

External links
 

 

Bishops of London
8th-century English bishops